Santa María Colotepec is a town and municipality in Oaxaca in south-western Mexico. The municipality covers an area of 415.837 km² (257.87 miles sq). 
It is part of the Pochutla District in the east of the Costa Region.

Abraham Ibarra Robles, a public servant from Santa María Colotepec, was murdered on January 20, 2017.

References

Municipalities of Oaxaca